Merille is a village in Marsabit County in northern Kenya. It is an emerging urban centre along the Isiolo-Moyale Highway, 120 km south of Marsabit town.

References

Populated places in Marsabit County